Benzie may refer to:

Percy Benzie Abery (1876–1948), 20th century Welsh photographer
Isa Benzie (1902–1988), British radio broadcaster
Isaac Benzie, founder of a department store in Aberdeen, Scotland
Benzie County, Michigan, county in the U.S. state of Michigan

See also
Benzie & Miller, small department store chain in Scotland that became part of House of Fraser in 1958
Benzi
Bonzi (disambiguation)
Bunzi